"Earthquake" is a song by British musician Labrinth which features long-time collaborator Tinie Tempah. The track was released on 23 October 2011 in the United Kingdom as the second single from the artist's debut studio album, Electronic Earth (2012). It debuted at number two on the UK Singles Chart, having sold 115,530 copies and setting the second-highest one-week sales at number 2 of the year, behind Little Mix.

Background
Labrinth first revealed the radio-edit of "Earthquake" on his official YouTube channel, on 16 September 2011. Remixes by Benny Benassi, Noisia, Eyes, Gareth Wyn and Street Policy were uploaded to Labrinth's SoundCloud account on the same day. Labrinth explained the song's meaning to MTV UK: "For me, the track is about making an earthquake and having people look my way because of how much noise I'm making. Sometimes, the one that shouts the loudest is the one that gets heard so, earthquake is shouting as high as it can." Both the royal trumpets and the operatic monk chorus part were last minute additions to the record. Labrinth inserted the bridge after a friend dared him to put it in.

The full explicit version of "Earthquake" was uploaded to Labrinth's SoundCloud account on 23 September 2011.

Labrinth and Tinie Tempah performed an acoustic version of "Earthquake" with an orchestra and choir in BBC Radio 1's Live Lounge on 20 October 2011.

On 1 January 2012, "Earthquake" was used for the New Year's Eve in London celebrations, during the fireworks display at the London Eye.

The "All-Stars" remix featuring rappers Kano, Wretch 32 and Busta Rhymes and new verses by Labrinth and Tinie Tempah was included on the bonus edition of his debut album. The official remix with only the Busta Rhymes verse was also released as a single in the US through iTunes on 21 February 2012 and was included on Now That's What I Call Music! 42 as a "Now What's Next" bonus track.

The song is in the key of C minor.

Music video
The HD video of the song was uploaded to Labrinth's official Vevo/YouTube channel on 11 October 2011. As of 26 May 2020, the song has received over 96 million views. The video was directed by US Studio, Syndrome Studios, edited by Aleks Colic.
This song also featured in the trailer for the video game DiRT:Showdown.

Track listing

Charts and certifications

Weekly charts

Year-end charts

Certifications

Release history

References 

Labrinth songs
Tinie Tempah songs
2011 singles
Song recordings produced by Labrinth
Syco Music singles
2011 songs
Songs about London
Songs written by Labrinth